Meshkin (also Romanized as Meshkīn, Meshgīn, Moshgīn, Moshkīn, and Mushkin) is a village in Qaqazan-e Gharbi Rural District, in the Central District of Takestan County, Qazvin Province, Iran. At the 2006 census, its population was 546, in 140 families.

References 

Populated places in Takestan County